A number of new Olympic and World records were set in various events at the 2010 Winter Olympics in Vancouver.

Figure skating

The following new ISU best scores were set during this competition:

Short track speed skating

OR = Olympic record, WR = World record

Speed skating

OR = Olympic record, TR = track record

World records set by date

References

2010 Winter Olympics
2010 Winter Olympics